Fezile Bhengu (born 6 August 1954) is the former Deputy Minister of Defence of South Africa until 11 May 2009, being succeeded by Thabang Makwetla.

References

Defence ministers of South Africa
Living people
1954 births